Richard Knyvet Wimbush (18 March 1909 - 4 January 1994), MBE was an eminent Anglican Priest in the 20th century.

Born into an ecclesiastical family on 18 March 1909 and educated at Haileybury, Oriel College, Oxford and Ripon College Cuddesdon, he was ordained in 1935. He began his career as Curate of his old Ripon College Cuddesdon and then held similar posts at Pocklington  and Harrogate. After this he was Rector of Melsonby and then Principal of Edinburgh Theological College. In 1963 he became Bishop of Argyll and The Isles. From 1974 he was also Primus of the Scottish Episcopal Church. Resigning in 1977 he became Priest in charge of Etton with Dalton Holme and an Assistant Bishop of York.

He died on 4 January 1994.

Notes

1909 births
People from Ryedale (district)
People educated at Haileybury and Imperial Service College
Alumni of Oriel College, Oxford
Alumni of Ripon College Cuddesdon
20th-century Scottish Episcopalian bishops
Bishops of Argyll and The Isles
Primuses of the Scottish Episcopal Church
1994 deaths
Clergy from Yorkshire